Chenfu is a town of Dachang Hui Autonomous County in the centre of the Sanhe exclave of Hebei province, China.

Administrative divisions 
As of 2020, Chenfu has 21 administrative villages under its administration.

See also
List of township-level divisions of Hebei

References

Township-level divisions of Hebei

Langfang